Baldwin Lee (born 1951) is a Chinese-American photographer and educator known for his photographs of African-American communities in the Southern United States. He has had solo exhibitions at the Chrysler Museum of Art and the Museum of Contemporary Art of Georgia, and received a Guggenheim Fellowship. His work is held in many private and public collections including the Museum of Modern Art in New York and Yale University Art Gallery.

Biography 
Lee was born in Brooklyn, New York in 1951. He received a BS from the Massachusetts Institute of Technology (1972) where he studied photography with Minor White, and went on to receive an MFA from Yale University (1975) where he studied with Walker Evans. 

In 1982, he became an art professor at the University of Tennessee, where he founded the university's photography program. He then decided to take a tour of the Deep South, covering 2,000 miles over the course of ten days. During this trip, Lee widely photographed the people, landscapes, and cities of the South. After developing his photos, he realized that he had a particular passion for the African-American communities he had interacted with. He took a longer tour of the southern United States from 1983 to 1989, producing roughly 10,000 photographs.

The majority of this work focused on the lives of low-income African-Americans. When Lee arrived in a new town, he would visit the police station and let them know that he was planning to take photos with expensive photography equipment, so they could warn him about the poorer, redlined parts of town. Lee would then make a point of visiting these neighborhoods, since they had the highest concentration of Black residents.

In his work, Lee strived to represent his subjects as individuals with vibrant personalities, rather than reducing them to stereotypes or emphasizing their poverty.

Lee retired from teaching in 2014, and is currently professor emeritus at University of Tennessee. He authored the monograph Baldwin Lee (2022), edited by Barney Kulok, which was short-listed for the Aperture/Paris-Photo Book of The Year Award in 2022.

Recognition 
Lee has received recognition for his contributions to American photography. The New Yorker Magazine called him "one of the great overlooked luminaries of American picture-making." Imani Perry wrote that "Lee has a sensitive eye for both poverty and dignity", describing him as "a witness to those at the bottom of U.S. stratification, and their refusal to swallow that status". In a 2015 essay in Time, photographer Mark Steinmetz wrote that Lee "produced a body of work that is among the most remarkable in American photography of the past half century".

Awards 
1984: Guggenheim Fellowship
1984 and 1987: National Endowment for the Arts Fellowship

Exhibitions

Solo exhibitions 
Baldwin Lee: The South in Black and White, Chrysler Museum of Art, 2012
Land Inhabited and Works of Baldwin Lee -The Do Good Fund-, Museum of Contemporary Art of Georgia, 2016

Group exhibitions 
Photography: Recent Acquisitions, Museum of Modern Art, New York, 1987
Vision, Language, and Influence: Photographs of the South, Knoxville Museum of Art, Knoxville, Tennessee, 2010

Collections 
Lee's work is held in the following permanent collections:
Museum of Modern Art
Yale University Art Gallery
Morgan Library and Museum
National Trust for Historic Preservation
Do Good Fund, a Georgia-based public charity

References

External links 
 

American people of Chinese descent
People from Brooklyn
Massachusetts Institute of Technology alumni
Yale University alumni
University of Tennessee faculty
1951 births
Living people
American photographers